Cesare Zilioli (born 21 April 1938) is an Italian sprint canoer. He competed at the 1960, 1964 and 1968 Olympics with the best results of sixth place in 1964, in the K-2 1000 m and K-4 1000 m events.

References

1938 births
Canoeists at the 1960 Summer Olympics
Canoeists at the 1964 Summer Olympics
Canoeists at the 1968 Summer Olympics
Italian male canoeists
Living people
Olympic canoeists of Italy
20th-century Italian people